Wichita Blue, known in 1994 as Wichita Blue Angels, was an American soccer club based in Wichita, Kansas.  The Blue played in several leagues including the Heartland Soccer League, Lone Star Soccer Alliance and the USISL.

History
In 1988, the Blue, owned by Ahmad Hassan joined the Heartland Soccer League.  In 1990, the team switched to the Lone Star Soccer Alliance.  In 1991, the Blue added a women's team and played their home games in Cessna Stadium.  Following the 1992 season, the LSSA folded.  The Blue sat out the 1993 season.  In 1994, the team moved to the USISL where they were known as the Wichita Blue Angels. In 1995, the team resumed its original name, the Wichita Blue.  The team withdrew from the league following the 1996 USISL season.  In 1999, the team returned to the USISL, but after finishing 7th out of 8 teams in the Heartland Division, the team permanently disbanded.

Year-by-year

Coaches
 Norman Piper 1989-1990
 Ahmad Hassan 1990 (interim)
 Doug McArthur 1990
 Omar Gomez 1991
 Dan Olson 1991
 Ahmad Hassan 1992
 Kevin Kewley 1994
 Ahmad Hassan 1995
 Jerry Lakin 1996
 David Voss 1999

References

External links
 Lone Star Soccer Alliance

Blue
Defunct soccer clubs in Kansas
Lone Star Soccer Alliance teams
USISL teams
1999 disestablishments in Kansas
1988 establishments in Kansas
Association football clubs established in 1988
Association football clubs disestablished in 1999